Benthomangelia gracilispira is a species of sea snail, a marine gastropod mollusk in the family Mangeliidae.

Description

Distribution
This marine species is found off Kalimantan, Indonesia, at a depth of 558 m.

References

 Powell, A.W.B., 1969: The family Turridae in the Indo-Pacific. Part 2. The subfamily Turriculinae. Indo-Pacific; Mollusca, 2 (10): 207–415. 
 Alexander Sysoev (1997), Mollusca Gastropoda: New deep-water turrid gastropods (Conoidea) from eastern Indonesia;  Résultats des Campagnes Musorstom volume16

gracilispira
Gastropods described in 1969